Singapore Cricket Association is the official governing body of the sport of cricket in Singapore. Its current headquarters is in Stadium Crescent, Singapore. Singapore Cricket Association is Singapore's representative at the International Cricket Council and is an associate member and has been a member of that body since 1974. It is also a member of the Asian Cricket Council.

History

Grounds
Kallang Ground and The Padang are two grounds in Singapore that have hosted international ODIs.  List of other grounds are provided in this link.

References

External links
 

Cricket administration
Cricket in Singapore
Cricket
1965 establishments in Singapore
Sports organizations established in 1965